WNNW (800 AM; "Power 800 AM/102.9 FM") is a commercial radio station licensed to Lawrence, Massachusetts, United States. Established in 1947 as WCCM, the station is owned by Costa-Eagle Radio Ventures, LP, a partnership between Pat Costa and the Lawrence Eagle-Tribune newspaper.  WNNW airs a Spanish-language tropical music format.

WNNW's transmitter is off Chandler Road in Andover, Massachusetts.  WNNW broadcasts at 3,000 watts by day.  But because AM 800 is a clear channel frequency reserved for Mexico, WNNW must reduce power at night to 244 watts.  It uses a non-directional antenna at all times.   WNNW is also heard on FM translator W275BH at 102.9 MHz, which also uses the same Andover tower as the AM station.

History
The 800 kHz frequency in Lawrence first signed on the air in August 1947. Its call sign was WCCM and it was owned by Lawrence Broadcasting Company.  An FM sister station, WGHJ at 93.7 MHz (today WEEI-FM) was launched in April 1960 as a full-time simulcast of WCCM.

In 1963, WCCM and WGHJ were sold to noted sportscaster Curt Gowdy, who changed WGHJ's call letters to WCCM-FM that year.  Both stations carried a full service middle of the road music format.   In 1974, the simulcast ended.  The FM station became WCGY, first airing a Top 40 format and later switching to album rock.  WCCM continued on AM 800, with some talk and Spanish programming.  As younger people switched to FM for their music, WCCM flipped to adult standards.

After Curt Gowdy sold WCGY to American Radio Systems in 1994, WCCM was put up for sale.  However, a buyer was not found until 1997, when the Costa-Eagle partnership agreed to purchase the station.  Soon after taking over a year later, Costa-Eagle shifted the station from adult standards to full service adult contemporary.

The following year, WCCM began marketing itself to the Lowell area, after WLLH (1400 AM) was sold and converted to Spanish-language programming.  WCCM opened a Lowell studio and hired several former WLLH personalities including news anchor Bob Ellis.  It began carrying Lowell Spinners baseball, which had previously aired on WLLH.  WCCM also began shifting back to standards, replacing satellite talk programming from Talk America with the "Music of Your Life Network" a few months later.

The Lowell studio was closed in 2002 after the station gradually phased out its use.  WCCM also ended out much of its music programming, with local talk shows during the day and sports radio programming from ESPN Radio during evenings, nights, and weekends.

The station was assigned the WNNW call letters on August 29, 2002.  It was part of a larger shuffle that resulted in WNNW moving its Spanish tropical format from 1110 AM and WCCM moving to 1490 AM, taking WHAV off-the-air in favor of WCEC, which took over 1110 AM with WHAV's former programming.  The changes formally took effect on-air that September.

In 2008, owner Pat Costa received Radio Ink Magazine's Medallas de Cortez Award for General Manager of the Year.  Later that year, Costa-Eagle purchased W275BH, a construction permit for an FM translator at 102.9 MHz in Newton, New Hampshire.  Costa-Eagle moved it to 92.1 FM in Lawrence in 2009 (thereby changing its call letters to W221CH).  It signed on that March as a simulcast of WNNW. In June 2011, the translator was moved to 102.9 FM (reclaiming the W275BH call letters) due to interference complaints from WFEX in Derry, New Hampshire and WPHX-FM in Sanford, Maine.

Translators

References

External links
 

 
 

Lawrence, Massachusetts
NNW
NNW
Radio stations established in 1947
Mass media in Essex County, Massachusetts
1947 establishments in Massachusetts
Tropical music radio stations